Fasinumab is a human monoclonal antibody designed for the treatment of acute sciatic pain.

This drug was developed in collaboration by Teva Pharmaceutical Industries and Regeneron Pharmaceuticals.

It is currently at Phase III trials (NCT03245008, NCT02683239, and NCT03161093).

See also
 List of investigational analgesics

References 

Monoclonal antibodies